The Kenya Standard Gauge Railway is a railway system that will connect Kenyan cities, and link the country to the neighboring country of Uganda, and through Uganda, to South Sudan, the Democratic Republic of the Congo, Rwanda, and Burundi. There are also plans to link to Addis Ababa, in neighboring Ethiopia to the north. The first segment, between Mombasa and Nairobi, opened passenger rail service in June 2017, and freight rail service in January 2018. Other segments are under construction or planned. The new Standard Gauge Railway (SGR), is intended to replace the old, inefficient metre-gauge railway system.

Location
The railway system consists of several major sections:
 Mombasa–Nairobi Section

Passenger rail services between Mombasa and Nairobi started on 1 June 2017, and freight rail services on 1 January 2018.

It was built between October 2016 and January 2018, by China Road and Bridge Corporation, at a cost of US$3.6 billion, 90 per cent of which was borrowed from the Exim Bank of China, with the Kenyan government providing the remaining 10 per cent.

 Nairobi–Naivasha Section

This section was also contracted to the company that constructed the Mombasa–Nairobi Section. Construction began in 2018 and the line was officially opened for passenger train service in October 2019. International freight for neighbouring countries interchanges at the Naivasha Inland Container Depot.

 Naivasha–Kisumu Section 
Loan papers between Kenya and China were scheduled for signatures in September 2018, but were deferred until a commercial viability study is conducted on the entire Mombasa–Kisumu railway.

 Kisumu–Malaba Section
CCCC, is the contractor for this section as well. The contract price for this section is about KSh. 169 billion (US$1.69 billion). The price for the Naivasha–Kisumu–Malaba section is KSh. 549 billion (US$5.49 billion) and includes the laying of railway tracks in both sections, dredging and expansion of the port of Kisumu, and the expansion and modernization of the inland container depot at Embakasi, in Nairobi.

 Lamu–Lokichar-Nakodok Section

This railway line, totaling , is a component of the Lamu Port and Lamu-Southern Sudan-Ethiopia Transport Corridor (LAPSSET) development project. Under the LAPSSET plan, this line would be extended to Juba in South Sudan.

 Nairobi–Moyale Section
This  section also falls under the LAPSSET program. It extends from Nairobi to Moyale, at the international border with Kenya's northern neighbor. It is planned to be extended to Addis Ababa, the capital city of Ethiopia.

 Naivasha–Lokichar Section
This proposed railway link, measuring an estimated , would link the two main standard gauge railway systems in Kenya; the Mombasa–Malaba SGR System and the Lamu–Nakodok SGR System.

Overview
This 1435 mm (4 ft  in) railway line is intended to ease the transfer of goods and passengers between the port of Mombasa and the cities of Nairobi and Kisumu, in Kenya, Kampala in Uganda, Kigali in Rwanda and subsequently to Bujumbura in Burundi, Juba in South Sudan and to Goma and Bunia in the Democratic Republic of the Congo.

In March 2019, during a state visit to Kenya, President Yoweri Museveni of Uganda and his host, President Uhuru Kenyatta of Kenya, jointly, publicly committed to extend the Standard Gauge Railway (SGR) to Kampala via Malaba.

The Kenyan government in 2020 reached a deal with AfriStar to take over operations and maintenance by May 2022.

Standards 
The lines are being built according to Chinese standards.

 Gauge: Standard gauge
 Couplers: Janney AAR
 Brakes: Air
 Electrification: Overhead catenary 25 kV AC / 50 Hz
 Target speed (passenger): 
 Target speed (freight): 
 Maximum train load (freight):  tonnes gross
 Designed transport capacity: 20 million tonnes annually
 Gross transport capacity: 24.9 million tonnes annually (taking double-track sections into account)
 Minimum railway curve radius:  ( at difficult locations)
 Maximum (ruling) gradient: 1.85% (1 in 54)
 Length of arrival & departure track at passing loops:  [resulting max. train length ~]
 Maximum vehicle loading gauge height: 
 Trains run on the: Left
 Railway signalling & train protection system: automatic block signaling & ETCS-2 SIL4
 Level crossings: permitted (no full grade separation)
 double stack ISO containers = 2 x  or 2 x  (unknown) on well cars.

See also
 Standard-gauge railway
 Isaka–Kigali Standard Gauge Railway

References

External links
East African leaders push for quick deal on SGR As of 26 June 2018.
Kenyan transport developments to fuel economic growth As of 2016.

Standard gauge railways in Kenya
International railway lines
2018 establishments in Kenya
Railway lines in Kenya
Government-owned companies of Kenya
Transport in Kenya